DeJuan Green is an American football player who played three seasons for the Oakland Raiders, from 2004 to 2006. Green was born in Jacksonville, Florida on May 13, 1980.

College
He played running back for the University of South Florida.

Professional career
He was signed as an undrafted free agent by the Oakland Raiders on April 29, 2004 after the 2004 NFL Draft.

On September 4, 2005, he was signed to the Oakland Raiders' practice squad.

On January 27, 2006, he was assigned to the Hamburg Sea Devils of NFL Europe.

On August 29, 2006, he was placed on injured reserve.

External links

1980 births
Living people
American football running backs
Oakland Raiders players
Hamburg Sea Devils players
South Florida Bulls football players
Players of American football from Jacksonville, Florida